Christopher Jessup (born September 17, 1998) is an American composer and pianist.

Life and career 
Jessup attended The Juilliard School from 2016 to 2021, studying with composer Melinda Wagner and pianist Jerome Lowenthal. Shortly after graduating from Juilliard in 2021, Jessup was signed to Navona Records.

Jessup has released music on London-based record label RMN Classical. He has received recognition from Oxford University, Steinway & Sons and National Sawdust. His compositions have been performed by The Juilliard Orchestra, The Brno Contemporary Orchestra, Hélène Grimaud, and Brett Deubner.

In 2020, Jessup was granted National Sawdust's BluePrint Fellowship. He also won top prizes in the Metropolitan Youth Orchestra's Emerging Composers Competition, the Princeton Piano Competition, and the Bradshaw & Buono International Competition.

References 

Living people
1998 births
21st-century American composers
21st-century American pianists
Place of birth missing (living people)
Juilliard School alumni